Cosimo Commisso may refer to:
 Cosimo Commisso (mobster), Italian criminal and member of the 'Ndrangheta
 Cosimo Commisso (scientist), Canadian biologist
 Cosimo Commisso (soccer) (born 1965), Canadian soccer player